The 2016 African Nations Championship is an international football tournament to be held in Rwanda from 16 January to 7 February 2016. Unlike the Africa Cup of Nations, this tournament requires players to be registered to a club within the country to be eligible. The 16 national teams involved in the tournament were required to register a squad of 23 players, including three goalkeepers. Only players in these squads were eligible to take part in the tournament. The squads were announced on 14 January 2016.

Group A

Rwanda
Head Coach:  Johnny McKinstry

Gabon
Head Coach: Stéphane Bounguendza

Morocco
Head Coach: Mohamed Fakhir

Ivory Coast
Head Coach:  Michel Dussuyer

Group B

DR Congo

Angola

Cameroon

Ethiopia

Group C

Tunisia
Head Coach: Hatem Missaoui

Nigeria
Head Coach: Sunday Oliseh

Niger

Guinea

Group D

Zimbabwe

Mali

Uganda

Zambia

References

Squads
African Nations Championship squads